It's a Pleasure may refer to:

It's a Pleasure (album), 2014 album by Baxter Dury
It's a Pleasure (film), 1945 film directed by William A. Seiter

See also
It's A Pleasure Doing Business With You, an album by Tim McGraw
It's a Business Doing Pleasure, album by Helix